Gesomyrmex is a genus of ants in the subfamily Formicinae. The genus contains six extant species, known from the Indomalayan realm, and nine fossil species. Of the extant species, four are known only from workers (G. chaperi, G. howardi, G. kalshoveni and G. spatulatus) and two only from females (G. luzonensis and G. tobiasi).  The extinct species "G. expectans" and 
"G.  miegi", formerly placed in the genus, were excluded by Dlussky et al.., 2009.

The living species are arboreal typically building nests in the twigs of trees.

Species
†Gesomyrmex bremii (Heer, 1849)
†Gesomyrmex breviceps Dlussky, Wappler & Wedmann, 2009
Gesomyrmex chaperi André, 1892
†Gesomyrmex curiosus Dlussky, Wappler & Wedmann, 2009
†Gesomyrmex flavescens Dlussky, Wappler & Wedmann, 2009
†Gesomyrmex germanicus Dlussky, Wappler & Wedmann, 2009
†Gesomyrmex hoernesi Mayr, 1868
Gesomyrmex howardi Wheeler, 1921
†Gesomyrmex incertus Dlussky, Rasnitsyn & Perfilieva, 2015
Gesomyrmex kalshoveni Wheeler, 1929
Gesomyrmex luzonensis (Wheeler, 1916)
†Gesomyrmex macrops Dlussky, Rasnitsyn & Perfilieva, 2015
†Gesomyrmex magnus Dlussky, Rasnitsyn & Perfilieva, 2015
†Gesomyrmex pulcher Dlussky, Wappler & Wedmann, 2009
Gesomyrmex spatulatus Cole, 1949
Gesomyrmex tobiasi Dubovikov, 2004

References

External links

Formicinae
Ant genera
Hymenoptera of Asia